Navjot Kaur (born 7 March 1995) is an Indian field hockey player. She is part of the Indian Women's Hockey team in the 2016 Summer Olympics.

Early life
She was born in Kurukshetra, Haryana. Her father is a Mechanic and her mother is a home-maker. "They are fully aware what the Olympics mean and are eagerly awaiting the day when I will take the field in Rio”, said Navjot Kaur.

Career
She was trained for hockey in Baldev Singh's academy in Shahbad. In one of her first tournaments at the U-19 level, she was the top-scorer. She has participated in more than a 100 international matches, representing India. In 2012, Kaur entered the International world of Hockey, playing against New Zealand after proving her talent in various Junior Leagues such as Junior Asia Cup, International U-21 tournament in the Netherlands, etc.

When Kaur completed her 100@th match, Md. Mushtaque Ahmad, the Secretary General of Hockey India, commented, “Navjot is a talented young player. She has proved her place in the team with several important performances and I congratulate her on completing her 100th international cap today. She has been an inspiration for young, budding players who are aspiring to take up hockey professionally."

Kaur belonged to the team that performed well at the Hockey World League Semifinals in 2015, which enabled India to enter Olympics. She also participated in the 17th Asian Games, 2016 Rio Olympics and the 4th Women's Asian Champions Trophy. She also played a role in India's campaign at the Women's Hockey World League Round 2 in Canada.

In the Asian World Cup, Navjot Kaur successfully scored five goals, not including the penalty shootouts. She netted two goals against Singapore, but none against Kazakhstan. She played vigorously and scored against Japan. She also netted a crucial goal against China again in the finals which was a game-changer as it was the only goal that was shot in the game and led the team to win 1–0. She said, "All the players were very excited as it was a big final against China. I did score the first goal, which was important as it helped us take the lead but the goal was a team effort."

She used to play as a midfielder but later she shifted to the forward line. According to Navjot, "My role hasn’t changed much because I was an attacking midfielder. But now I get more scoring opportunities.”

Not only was she the highest scorer among the forwards, but she was also selected as the Player of the Match in the final.

Personal life
Her hobbies include music and painting.

Her inspirations include Jasjeet Kaur and Rani Rampal. Her favourite player is Jamie Dwyer, an Australian hockey player, who she met during the Olympics. She considers her father to be the biggest influence in her life. According to her, “He always supports me and is there for me.”

Kaur believes that corruption, casteism, and lack of education to all, are the main challenges that India is facing today.

References

External links

Navjot Kaur at Hockey India

Indian female field hockey players
Living people
1995 births
Olympic field hockey players of India
Field hockey players at the 2016 Summer Olympics
Field hockey players at the 2020 Summer Olympics
21st-century Indian women
21st-century Indian people
Sportswomen from Haryana
Field hockey players from Haryana
Female field hockey forwards
People from Kurukshetra district
Field hockey players at the 2014 Asian Games
Field hockey players at the 2018 Asian Games
Asian Games silver medalists for India
Asian Games bronze medalists for India
Asian Games medalists in field hockey
Medalists at the 2014 Asian Games
Medalists at the 2018 Asian Games
Field hockey players at the 2014 Commonwealth Games
Field hockey players at the 2018 Commonwealth Games
Commonwealth Games competitors for India